ITRC may refer to:

 Indian Institute of Toxicology Research
 Irish Tarmac Rally Championship